Rybalka is a surname of Ukrainian origin derived from an occupation of fisherman.

Notable people with this surname include:

 Oleksandr Rybalka (? - 1938), repressed bandura musician of Ukraine, member of the Kyiv Bandurist Capella
 Ivan Rybalka (1919 - 2001), doctor of historical sciences, creator of the Department of History of Ukraine at the University of Kharkiv
 Serhiy Rybalka (1990 - ), professional Ukrainian footballer

See also
 Rybak

Slavic-language surnames
Ukrainian-language surnames
Occupational surnames